Francesca Caccini (18 September 1587 – after 1641) was an Italian composer, singer, lutenist, poet, and music teacher of the early Baroque era. She was also known by the nickname "La Cecchina" , given to her by the Florentines and probably a diminutive of "Francesca". She was the daughter of Giulio Caccini. Her only surviving stage work, La liberazione di Ruggiero, is widely considered the oldest opera by a woman composer. As a female composer she helped to solidify the agency and the cultural and political programs of her female patron.

Personal life

Early life 
Caccini was born in Florence, and received a humanistic education (Latin, some Greek, as well as modern languages and literature, mathematics) in addition to early musical training with her father. According to Liliana Panella, the first well-founded testimony of Francesca's singer's activity, together with her sister Settimia, at the Medici court, is 1602: in his diary Cesare Tinghi notes that on 3 April 1602 St. Nicholas church in Pisa, where the court moved every year during Lent, polychoral music was directed by "Giulio Romano [Giulio Caccini], having the wife (the second wife, Margherita) and the two daughters singing well".

In her early life, Caccini performed with her parents, her half-brother Pompeo, her sister Settimia, and possibly other unnamed Caccini pupils in an ensemble contemporaries referred to as le donne di Giulio Romano. After she was hired by the court, she continued to perform with the family ensemble until Settimia's marriage and resulting move to Mantua caused its breakup. Caccini served the Medici court as a teacher, chamber singer, rehearsal coach and composer of both chamber and stage music until early 1627. By 1614 she was the court's most highly paid musician, in no small part because her musical virtuosity so well exemplified an idea of female excellence projected by Tuscany's de facto Regent, Grand-Duchess Christina of Lorraine. By 1623 she earned 240 scudi.

Later life 
After Caccini's first husband (Giovanni Battista Signorini, with whom she had one daughter, Margherita, in 1622) died in December 1626, she quickly arranged to marry again in October 1627, this time to a melophile nobleman in Lucca, Tommaso Raffaelli. Although her legal name remained Francesca de Giulio Caccini, it was only the discovery of documents using Francesca Raffaelli that makes it possible to follow her traces from 1627 to 1634. 
She lived in Raffaelli's Lucchese homes, apparently bearing a son (also Tommaso, in 1628), and having some musical relationship to the Buonvisi family in Lucca, until his death in 1630. Although as the wife of a nobleman she had declined at least one request to perform (in Parma, in 1628), once she was widowed Caccini immediately tried to return to Medici service. Her return delayed by the plagues of 1630–33, by 1634 Caccini was back in Florence with her two children, serving the court as music teacher to her daughter Margherita and to the Medici princesses who lived at or frequently visited the convent of La Crocetta, and composing and performing chamber music and minor entertainments for the women's court. Caccini left Medici service on 8 May 1641, and disappeared from the public record.

Professional career 
Caccini is believed to have been a quick and prolific composer, equal in productivity to her court colleagues Jacopo Peri and Marco da Gagliano. Very little of her music survives. Most of her stage music was composed for performance in comedies by poet Michelangelo Buonarroti the Younger (grand-nephew of the artist) such as La Tancia (1613), Il passatempo (1614) and La fiera (1619). In 1618 she published a collection of thirty-six solo songs and soprano/bass duets (Il primo libro delle musiche) that is a compendium of contemporary styles, ranging from intensely moving, harmonically adventurous laments to joyful sacred songs in Italian and Latin, to witty strophic songs about the joys and perils of romantic love.

In winter 1625 Caccini composed all the music for a 75-minute "comedy-ballet" entitled La liberazione di Ruggiero dall'isola d'Alcina which was performed for the visiting crown prince of Poland, Ladislaus Sigismondo (later Władysław IV). Combining witty parodies of early opera's stock scenes and self-important characters with moments of surprising emotional intensity, the score shows that Caccini had mastered the full range of musico-theatrical devices in her time and that she had had a strong sense of large-scale musical design. La liberazione so pleased the prince that he had it performed in Warsaw in 1628. This is also widely regarded as the first opera written by a female. There is no evidence to suggest that Caccini composed any of the accompanying poetry, however, it is known that her peers Michelangelo Buonarroti, Andrea Salvadori and Francesco Gualterotti.

Compositional style 
Caccini's musical and compositional style has been likened to that of Monteverdi and Jacopo Peri, and she started composing music after the closing of the Renaissance period, becoming a key player in pushing the Baroque style of music forward. She composed within a very innovative musical context. For many of her songs, she was the author of the accompanying poetry, which also tended to be comedic.

Caccini's Primo libro is noted as utilising self-reflexivity. This is because many of her songs within this collection have titles which appear to 'answer' one another. For example the song "Che fai?" which means "what are you doing?" is followed by "Ardo" which translates to "I burn." The songs are also advanced in terms of breath control needed for performance, coordination of hands and voice, as well as the vocal range. Caccini uses romanescas in a unique and unconventional way in these songs. The songs in this collection is accompanied by an instrumental piece, with the intention of the individual performer improvising harmonies over. Although the musical pieces did not denote a specific instrument to use to play the accompaniment, it is likely that a theorbo would be widely used.

Works
Francesca Caccini wrote some or all of the music for at least sixteen staged works. All but La liberazione di Ruggiero and some excerpts from La Tancia and Il passatempo published in the 1618 collection are believed lost. Her surviving scores reveal Caccini to have taken extraordinary care over the notation of her music, focusing special attention on the rhythmic placement of syllables and words, especially within ornaments, on phrasing as indicated by slurs, and on the precise notation of often very long, melodically fluid vocal melismas. Although her music is not especially notable for the expressive dissonances made fashionable by her contemporary Monteverdi, Caccini was a master of dramatic harmonic surprise: in her music it is harmony, more than counterpoint, that most powerfully communicates affect.

Opera and stage works:

La Stiava (performed 1607) (lost)
La mascherata, delle ninfe di Senna, balletto, Palazzo Pitti, Florence, 1611
La tancia, incidental music, Palazzo Pitti, Florence, 1611
Il passatempo, incidental music to balletto, Pallazo Pitti, Florence, 1614
Il ballo delle Zingane, balletto, Palazzo Pitti, Florence, music lost, 1615
Il Primo libro delle musiche a 1–2 voci e basso continuo (1618)
La fiera, incidental music, Palazzo Pitti, Florence, 1619
Il martirio de S. Agata, Florence, 1622
La liberazione di Ruggiero dall'isola d'Alcina, musical comedy, Villa Poggio Imperiale, Florence (1625)
Rinaldo inamorato, commissioned by Prince Wladislaw of Poland, 1626.

See also 

 Settima Caccini
 Women in Music
List of classical music composers by era

References
Notes

Sources

Further reading

Harness, Kelley (2006). Echoes of Women's voices: Music, Art and Female Patronage in Early Modern Florence. University of Chicago Press. 

Miranda, Marina Lobato,  Francesca Caccini (1587-1641): Composer, Performer, and Professor Represented in Il Primo Libro Delle Musiche Georgia State University.
Bujić, Bojan; Rose, Gloria (1968). "Francesca Caccini". Music & Letters. ISSN 0027-4224.
Raney, Carolyn (1967). "Francesca Caccini's 'Primo Libro'". Music & Letters. ISSN 0027-4224.
Duncan, Cheryll (2018). "The Siren of Heaven—A Glimpse into the Life and Works of Francesca Caccini by Juliet Fraser (soprano) and Jamie Akers (theorbo) (review)". Early Modern Women. ISSN 2378-4776.

External links

Free choral scores by Francesca Caccini at the Choral Public Domain Library

Italian Baroque composers
Italian women classical composers
Italian opera composers
1587 births
1640s deaths
Women opera composers
Musicians from Florence
17th-century Italian composers
17th-century Italian actresses
Italian stage actresses
17th-century Italian women
17th-century women composers